3 Nations Floorball League is the central European floorball league founded in 2020. The league mainly focuses on teams from Slovenia, Austria and Hungary.

References

Floorball
Sport in Slovenia
Floorball in Hungary
Sport in Austria